This list contains virtually every officially released track by the Beach Boys, including cover versions, outtakes, B-sides, and non-album singles.

Singles are labelled as "non-album" if they were not included on an LP within 12 months of release.

This list excludes:
 solo recordings by the individual members, unless they have been released as a track on a Beach Boys record (such as Brian Wilson's first solo record, "Caroline, No")
 live performances, alternate mixes, or rerecordings of previously released songs, unless they are notably different from the original (such as the extended disco single edit of "Here Comes the Night")

For unreleased tracks, see List of unreleased songs recorded by the Beach Boys.

List

Notes

References

Bibliography

External links 
Extended Beach Boys Discography

Beach Boys